Armavir is a 1991 Soviet drama film directed by Vadim Abdrashitov.

Plot 
The ship crashes. Marina is wanted by her husband and father, who hate each other and find her as a result of long searches, but she does not recognize them.

Cast 
 Sergey Koltakov as Semin
 Sergey Shakurov as Aksyuta
 Elena Shevchenko as Marina-Larisa
 Sergey Garmash as Ivan
 Maria Stroganova as Natasha
 Pyotr Zaychenko as Neptune
 Rim Ayupov as 'Katala'
 Natalya Potapova	
 Aleksandr Vdovin
 Zhanat Baishanbayev as Timur

References

External links 
 

1991 films
1990s Russian-language films
Mosfilm films
Soviet drama films
1991 drama films